Cesaria may refer to:
Cesaria River, an old name for the Cohansey River
Cesária, a 1995 album by Cesária Évora